Constantin Eruli (also Costantino Eroli) (died 1500) was a Roman Catholic prelate who served as Bishop of Spoleto (1474–1500), Bishop of Todi (1472–1474), Bishop of Narni (1462–1472).

Biography
On 10 December 1462, he was appointed during the papacy of Pope Pius II as Bishop of Narni.
On 8 January 1472, he was appointed during the papacy of Pope Sixtus IV as Bishop of Todi.
On 8 December 1474, he was appointed during the papacy of Sixtus IV as Bishop of Spoleto.
He served as Bishop of Spoleto until his death in 1500. 
While bishop, he was the principal co-consecrator of Agostino Patrizi de Piccolomini, Bishop of Pienza.

References

External links and additional sources
 (Chronology of Bishops) 
 (Chronology of Bishops) 
 (for Chronology of Bishops) 
 (for Chronology of Bishops) 
 (Chronology of Bishops) 
 (Chronology of Bishops) 

15th-century Italian Roman Catholic bishops
Bishops appointed by Pope Pius II
Bishops appointed by Pope Sixtus IV
1500 deaths